The Interactive Museum EPM is in Medellín, Colombia. It is part of the Barefoot Park and receives about a 1,000 visitors a day, mostly students. The museum provides an educational tour of 22 rooms spread over four buildings with technology explained in an entertaining way and guests interacting with the physical principles of water, energy, gas and telecommunications. It is funded and managed by Empresas Públicas de Medellín.

See also
 Intelligent Building EPM

Museums in Medellín
Technology museums